Kan-Achuu Nature Park is in Toguz-Toro District of Jalal-Abad Region of Kyrgyzstan established in September 2015. The purpose of the park is conservation of the unique nature complexes and biodiversity, conservation of rare and endangered flora and fauna species, and extending network of specially protected areas of Kyrgyz Republic. It currently covers 30,496.5 hectares. The park is situated in the eastern spurs of the Fergana Range, in the basin of the rivers Baydamtal, Kan-Achuu and Kökirim.

References

Protected areas established in 2015
National parks of Kyrgyzstan